Oscar Joseph Dugey (October 25, 1887 – January 1, 1966) was a Major League Baseball player. He played mostly at second base, but also appeared in 20 games at third base. He was a member of the Braves team during the 1914 season, which saw the "Miracle Braves" win the World Series after being in last place in July. Following his playing career, Dugey was a coach for the Braves and Chicago Cubs.

External links

Major League Baseball second basemen
Boston Braves players
Philadelphia Phillies players
Waco Navigators players
New Orleans Pelicans (baseball) players
St. Paul Saints (AA) players
Baseball players from Texas
Chicago Cubs coaches
1887 births
1966 deaths
People from Palestine, Texas
Burials at Oakland Cemetery (Dallas, Texas)